The 1897 Maryland Aggies football team represented the Maryland Agricultural College (now the University of Maryland) in the 1897 college football season. The team was led by second-year head coach Grenville Lewis.

Schedule

Players
The letterwinners of the 1897 team were:
James Blandford, guard
William Bouscaren, halfback
Dorsey Cashell, guard
Grant C. Church, end
Sam Cooke, fullback
Charles Gibbons, halfback
Wade Hinebaugh, end
Frank Kenly, quarterback
John Lillibridge, end and captain-coach
Charles Ridgeley, tackle/fullback
James Shipley, center

Non-letterwinners:
Fred Bell, tackle
Vernon Rollins, tackle
Ed Speake, tackle
Bob Hildebrand, guard
Harry Stanford, guard
Hanson Mitchell, quarterback
Levin Dericksen, halfback
George Peterson, halfback

Manager:
John Mitchell

References

Maryland
Maryland Terrapins football seasons
Maryland Aggies football